Banksia concinna is a species of shrub that is endemic to Western Australia. It has elliptical leaves with between five and twenty triangular teeth on each side, hairy heads of yellow flowers and hairy, egg-shaped fruit.

Description
Banksia comosa is an erect shrub with a single or a few main stems and that typically grows to a height of  but does not form a lignotuber. Each side of the leaf has between seven and twenty triangular teeth.

Taxonomy and naming
This species was first formally described in 1830 by Robert Brown who gave it the name Dryandra concinna and published the description in the supplement to his Prodromus Florae Novae Hollandiae et Insulae Van Diemen. The specific epithet (concinna) is a Latin word meaning "pretty", "neat" or "elegant". In 2007 Austin Mast and Kevin Thiele transferred all dryandras to the genus Banksia and renamed this species Banksia concinna.

Distribution and habitat
Banksia concinna grows in dense kwongan and shrubland in the Stirling Range National Park and near Albany.

Conservation status
This banksia is classified as "Priority Four" by the Government of Western Australia Department of Parks and Wildlife, meaning that is rare or near threatened.

References

 

concinna
Plants described in 1830
Endemic flora of Western Australia
Eudicots of Western Australia
Taxa named by Kevin Thiele